EJU may refer to:
 easyJet Europe
 European Jewish Union
 European Judo Union
 Examination for Japanese University Admission